The 1897–98 Northern Football League season was the ninth in the history of the Northern Football League, a football competition in Northern England. This was the first season in which the Northern League was split into two divisions.

Division One

The division featured 9 clubs which competed in the last season, no new clubs joined the league this season.

League table

Division Two

The division featured 7 new clubs.

League table

References

1897-98
1897–98 in English association football leagues